Four Hundred Souls: A Community History of African America, 1619–2019 is a 2021 anthology of essays, commentaries, personal reflections, short stories, and poetry, compiled and edited by Ibram X. Kendi and Keisha N. Blain. Conceived and created to commemorate the four hundred years that had passed since the arrival of the first Africans in Virginia, the book concerns African-American history and collects works written by ninety Black writers. A winner or finalist of multiple awards in its print and audiobook editions, Four Hundred Souls has been widely praised by reviewers for its prose and historical content.

Background 
From 1841 to 2019, the vast majority of books telling a history of African America were written by individuals, also almost always male. As the 400th anniversary of Black Africans' arrival in British North America approached, Ibram X. Kendi contemplated how to commemorate the "symbolic birthday of Black America" and the whole 400-year period. Kendi resolved to invert the trend by "bringing together a community of writers" and encouraging them to both write history and make history, creating an artifact capturing what Black Americans were thinking during that anniversary year.

Kendi and Keisha N. Blain collaborated to compile and edit the book project, titled Four Hundred Souls: A Community History of African America, 1619–2019, and together they invited ten poets and eighty writers from a diverse range of professions—including historians, anthropologists, journalists, novelists, economists, theologians, educators, and more—to contribute. Reviewer Don Polite called the resulting contributor list a "who's who of African America" and "a remarkable cross section of the Black community". Many contributors are "huge names", but Four Hundred Souls also features numerous "up-and-coming writers". Most of the authors wrote their chapters in 2019.

Blain remembered the process being a "moving experience". The COVID-19 pandemic began while Kendi and Blain were in the process of assembling the book; feeling that she was at work on something historically significant comforted Blain during a time of intense loss and loneliness. The book is dedicated "to Black lives lost to COVID-19".

While contrasting with past single-author histories of Black America, Four Hundred Souls also emerges in a tradition of Black-written anthologies "of historical observations, poetry, scholarship, and vignettes" in the vein of Abraham Chapman's Black Voices: An Anthology of Afro-American Literature and Maya Angelou's I Know Why the Caged Bird Sings.

During a later stage of producing the book, Kendi and Blain decided that for the audiobook version, they wanted to "actualize what [Kendi] wrote about" in his introductory description of the book's "community of writers [being] like a choir". To evoke this effect, they chose to pursue a full-cast audiobook. The cast features eighty-seven narrators, some of whom are contributors to the book who narrate their own chapters. Others feature only as narrators in the audiobook; this cast includes actress Danai Gurira, broadcast journalist Soledad O'Brien, and singer Phylicia Rashad, among many others. In the interest of enabling each narrator to give a passionate performance, the producers did not assign chapters to narrators and instead allowed cast members to choose which contributions they were interested in narrating. Narration was recorded in December 2020 and January 2021. Because of the COVID-19 pandemic, most narrators recorded at home studio setups.

Summary 

Four Hundred Souls features essays, biographical sketches, short stories, and poems by ninety Black writers. It chronologically spans the 400-year length of African-American history, beginning in 1619 with the arrival of the first Africans in Virginia and ending in 2019. The book is divided into ten sections, each of which examine a period of 40 years. Each section concludes with a poem. There are eighty essays featured in the book, each of which chronicle a five-year period. Kendi and Blain invited some contributors to write about specific topics, such as asking Barbara Smith to write about the Combahee River Collective. With other writers, they worked together to find subjects that were good fits. In every case, the choice was up to the contributor. This "democratising approach" makes Four Hundred Souls a "people's history" told by and about African Americans themselves. 

Following an introduction by Ibram X. Kendi, the anthology begins with an essay by Nikole Hannah-Jones, who developed The New York Times 1619 Project. Chapter subjects include policy, political events, elements of culture, revised historical narratives, and biographies. Some chapters offer fresh insight on well-known subjects, such as the essays on Phyllis Wheatley, Booker T. Washington, and Black Power; while others spotlight little-known history, such as the life of Black New Yorker James McCune Smith. Each essay can function and be read individually, but together they highlight the "entangled histories" of African America. The book's final essay is written by Alicia Garza, who co-founded the Black Lives Matter movement.

Thematic threads weave through the chronological chapters, such as the theme of white–Black sexual encounters or perceptions (threading "Whipped for Lying With a Black Woman", "Sally Hemings", "Lynching", and "Anita Hill"). Another theme is the dynamism of enslavement and racism, as chapters explore how white Americans shifted strategies in attempts to preserve power and how Black Americans perpetually "sought to define their freedom." The resilience of the Black American community is another important theme in Four Hundred Souls. The book portrays "the endurance and resilience of how Blacks resisted, revolted, organized, demanded, protested and rebelled", as reviewer George McCalman describes. Four Hundred Souls also leverages its diverse pool of contributors to deconstruct the notion of a monolithic African America. Advancing this theme, the book's "eighty different minds, reflecting eighty different perspectives" reveals a "community of difference" that brings together Black America without homogenizing the many individuals in the community.

The anthology's overall voice is earnest and intimate. A "human element" lies at the heart of Four Hundred Souls' success as a book. The poetry, punctuating every forty-year section, contributes to humanizing and "elaborat[ing] on the historical narratives", enhancing the punch of academic information by giving it a personal edge.

For the audiobook edition, each chapter is read by one of the cast's eighty-seven narrators. The readings vary in tone across the book, ranging between "straightforward or theatrical as appropriate" to the chapter. Between chapters, multiple narrators read the transitions simultaneously, their voices overlapping in collective lines. In the credits, each cast member speaks their own name.

Publication 
One World, an imprint of Random House, published Four Hundred Souls and released the book on February 2, 2021. The book sold as a 528-page hardcover for $32 (USD) on release. The cover, designed by Michael Morris, features artwork by Bayo Iribhogbe that according to editor Blain depicts the book's "spirit of community". A paperback edition was released a year later, on February 1, 2022.

Penguin Random House released the audiobook of Four Hundred Souls in February 2021, selling the trade edition for $22.50 and the library edition for $95. The audiobook edition does not include the endnotes of the print version. Its runtime is fourteen hours and two minutes.

Reception 
Ahead of and upon its release, Four Hundred Souls met wide approval from readers and reviewers. The book debuted at number two on The New York Times nonfiction bestseller list for the week ending February 6, 2021. In September 2021, GOBI Library Solutions ranked Four Hundred Souls second in a list of forty academic bestsellers for that year. Washington Post editors and reviewers numbered it among the Post's "50 notable works of nonfiction" in 2021. Four Hundred Souls was also an IndieBound Bestseller.

Publishers Weekly described the book as an "energetic collection" that "stands apart from standard anthologies of African American history." Writing for Booklist, Leslie Williams wrote that Four Hundred Souls "crackles with rage, beauty, bitter humor, and the indomitable will to survive."  In a starred review, Kirkus Reviews called it an "impeccable, epic, essential vision of American history as a whole and a testament to the resilience of Black people." Kirkus singled out the essays of Raquel Willis, Robert Jones Jr., Barbara Smith, and Esther Armah as the "standouts" in the book. Binghamton University newspaper BingUNews called Four Hundred Souls "one of [Keisha N.] Blain's most significant professional accomplishments". Seattle Book Reviews rated Four Hundred Souls five stars out of five.

Numerous reviewers urged the public to read it and for libraries to stock it. Library Journal declared Four Hundred Souls essential to include in libraries. Reviewer Don Polite especially praised its essay format, suggesting the book is "almost tailor-made" to accompany undergraduate courses or inspire discussion in community spaces.

In an otherwise glowing review of the book, Randal Maurice Jelks pointed out Four Hundred Souls' "sparse attention" to Black-created institutions such as churches, banks, businesses, cubs, temples, mosques, and more; only a few chapters in the book directly address Black institutions despite their importance in the African American experience. Although the book includes endnotes, Library Journal suggests that readers seeking a traditionally "scholarly treatment of the history of racism in the United States" might be better served by a book like Kendi's Stamped from the Beginning.

The magazine BookPage recognized Four Hundred Souls' audiobook edition with a starred review and praised the cast as a "heartfelt chorus of voices". BookPage's review noted the "layered, echoing voices" used in the audiobook's transitions and complimented the "haunting, emotional effect" achieved by such collective lines. AudioFile magazine spotlighted J. D. Jackson, Kevin R. Free, January LaVoy, and Robin Miles for being especially "masterful" while adding that "at least two dozen more" narrators deserved the same praise.

In 2021, AudioFile recognized Four Hundred Souls with its Earphones Award for Best Audiobook. The American Library Association shortlisted Four Hundred Souls as a finalist for the 2022 Andrew Carnegie Medal for Excellence in Nonfiction. Four Hundred Souls was also a 2022 finalist for the Multi-voiced Performance category of the Audie Awards administered by the Audio Publishers Association.

Table of contents 
Four Hundred Souls is  four parts, each of which contains ten essays and ends with a poem. The audiobook adds narrators.

See also 

 African-American history
 Charleston Syllabus
 How to Be an Antiracist
 The 1619 Project

References

External links 
 Four Hundred Souls page on Ibram X. Kendi's website
 Four Hundred Souls page on Keisha N. Blain's website
 Discussion guide for educators or book clubs
2021 anthologies
2021 non-fiction books
2021 poetry books
African-American literature
American anthologies
American poetry anthologies
Audiobooks
Books about race and ethnicity
Books by Ibram X. Kendi
Essay anthologies
Non-fiction books about American slavery
One World (imprint) books